Marx/Engels Collected Works (also known as MECW) is the largest existing collection of English translations of works by Karl Marx and Friedrich Engels. Its 50 volumes contain publications by Marx and Engels released during their lifetimes, many unpublished manuscripts of Marx's economic writings, and extensive personal correspondence. The Collected Works, for the most part compiled by the Institute of Marxism-Leninism of the CC CPSU, was issued from 1975 to 2004 by Progress Publishers (1931, Moscow) in collaboration with Lawrence and Wishart (1936, London) and International Publishers (1924, New York City).

History and overview

Although about a third of Marx and Engels' works were originally written in English and partly published in the British or American press, the vast majority of their literary legacy was not collected, translated (where necessary) and made available in an extensive English edition for decades after their death.

In the Soviet Union, comprehensive collections of the works of Marx and Engels were already compiled in the 1920s and 1930s (an aborted complete edition, MEGA1, as well as a first Russian edition in 28 volumes, Sochineniya1). But only following the publication of new editions in Russian and German in the 1950s and 1960s (Sochineniya2 and Marx-Engels-Werke with 39 basic volumes and a few more supplementary ones later on), an English edition begun being prepared by Soviet editors with the help of the publishing houses of the Communist Parties in Great Britain and the USA and translators from these countries.

After general editing principles had been agreed upon by the representatives of all three sides (Institute of Marxism-Leninism and Progress Publishers, Moscow, the Central Committees of the CPs in Great Britain and the US and their publishers Lawrence and Wishart, London, and International Publishers, New York) at a conference in Moscow in December 1969, the first volume of the new edition was published in 1975.

More than forty volumes were published before the fall of the USSR; the few remaining ones were completed and issued by 2004 (V. 50).

Large parts of both authors' early writings, many of their newspaper articles (e.g. from the Neue Rheinische Zeitung 1848-49) and most of their letters as well as many of Marx's economic manuscripts were published in English for the first time in the Collected Works. In total, the 50 volumes comprise 1,968 works and other documents (of which 805 were published in English for the first time) and 3,957 letters (of which 2,283 had never been published in English before).

The Collected Works consists of writings by Marx between 1835 and his death in 1883, and by Engels between 1838 and his death in 1895. Early volumes (V. 1-2) include juvenilia, such as correspondence between Marx and his father, Marx's poetry, and letters from Engels to his sister. The edition also contains several major, well-known works by Marx and Engels, such as The Condition of the Working Class in England (V. 4), The Communist Manifesto (V. 6), The Eighteenth Brumaire of Louis Napoleon (V. 11), and Anti-Dühring (V. 25).

The collection is divided into three parts. Volumes 1-27 collect the political, philosophical, historical and journalistic writings of the authors, in chronological order. Volumes 28-37 specifically collect Marx's writings on political economy, including a large amount of draft material and manuscripts which culminated in the three volumes of Capital (V. 35-37). Finally, volumes 38-50 collect the letters and personal correspondence of the authors.

Contents by volume

Although most of MECW's volumes include material written by Marx and Engels (whether separately or as co-authors), a large minority of volumes are devoted to material written by only one author. Red check marks indicate the author's presence in a volume, while black X marks indicate that the author's work is absent. Although the volumes typically contain large varieties of material, only major selected items are listed below, for illustration.

Differences with other Marx/Engels collections 

Although the Collected Works is the most comprehensive English translation of Marx and Engels' work, it is not their complete work. An ongoing project to publish the pair's complete works in their original language (Marx-Engels-Gesamtausgabe) is expected to require 114 volumes.
However, as MEGA differs from MECW particularly in content in that it presents numerous excerpts and notes in its fourth section, publishes the letters to Marx and Engels from third persons, and prints various editions of the same works (e.g. Capital), the overwhelming majority of the published writings, manuscripts, and letters of Marx and Engels are in any case included in MECW.

See also

 Marx-Engels-Gesamtausgabe (MEGA), a project in progress to publish the complete untranslated works of Marx and Engels with extensive critical apparatus.
 The Karl Marx Library, an aborted 13 volume series edited by Saul K. Padover, terminated in 1977.

References

External links

 "Index to Marx/Engels Collected Works", Marxists Internet Archive

20th-century books
Books by Karl Marx
Books by Friedrich Engels
Books by Karl Marx and Friedrich Engels
Communist books
Political books
Marx/Engels Collected Works